"Eisberg" is a song by German recording artist Andreas Bourani. It was written by Bourani along with Tom Olbrich and Julius Hartog for his debut album Staub & Fantasie (2011), while production was helmed by Andreas Herbig and Peter "Jem" Seifert. Released as the album's seconds single, the pop ballad was significantly less successful than its predecessor "Nur in meinem Kopf", reaching the top fifty on the German Singles Chart only.

Formats and track listings

Charts

Weekly charts

References

2011 singles
Andreas Bourani songs
2011 songs
Universal Music Group singles
Songs written by Andreas Bourani